Miss Teen World is an annual international teen beauty pageant held in Ecuador.

The international pageant was established in 2001 by Cesar Montece, its founder.

The current Miss Teen World is Gugulethu Mayisela of South Africa who was crowned on October 19, 2022.

History
Miss Teen World pageant was launched in the year 2001 in Ecuador and was continued in the coming year as well.

Its founder César Montecé, businessman of beauty with more than 40 years of experience in the field, died in 2010.

In October, 2012, Cesar Montecé's sister, who was listed as a partner in her brother's company, sold all the rights of the contest in front of the notary public, however the international competition was officially relaunch in Ecuador, in 2014.

Social Responsibility

Miss Teen World is a competition for teens that is committed to social responsibility,  it is for that reason that its founder has raised 50% of ticket sales of the competition to help the Center for Social Pediatrics and Rehabilitation  called "Kinderzentrum" in conjunction with the Foundation "Herta Seebass" based in Ecuador that help children between 0 and 12 years old who have Down syndrome, cerebral palsy, autism, hyperactivity, language and physical problems, congenital or acquired.

The organization is directed by Rodrigo Moreira its current president who, since he has taken office, has initiated a Pediasure collection campaign to help raise awareness about childhood cancer and donate it children with treatment at the Hospital Sociedad de Lucha Contra el Cancer SOLCA, also each contestant brings with them gifts that are donated to children in the pediatric and intensive area.

In this context, the reigning Miss Teen World 2020 Tyana Maldonado from Dominican Republic attended to the St. Jude Walk / Run 5k event held in the United States to raise money for childhood cancer research and the kids of St. Jude Children's Research Hospital, who have the opportunity to receive treatments regardless of their family's economic situation.

Titleholders
The following women have been crowned Miss Teen World

Countries/Territory by winning number

List of runners-up
This table shows the Runner-up of the competition, from its 2021 edition.

Best International Typical Costume
The following contestants have won the competition.

Major beauty pageants
Miss Teen World titleholders in the world's major beauty contests.

See also
 Miss Teenager World

References

External links
 Official website

Beauty pageants for youth
Recurring events established in 2001
Youth events
International beauty pageants